Rettacarus is a genus of mites in the family Acaridae.

Species
 Rettacarus rettenmeyerorum S. Mahunka, 1979

References

Acaridae